Club Deportivo Coria is a Spanish football club  based in Coria, Cáceres, in the autonomous community of Extremadura. Founded in 1969, the club plays in the Segunda División RFEF – Group 5, and holds home games at Estadio La Isla, with a 3,000-seat capacity.

Season to season

1 season in Segunda División RFEF
28 seasons in Tercera División

References

External links
Official website 
Futbolme team profile 

Football clubs in Extremadura
Association football clubs established in 1969
1969 establishments in Spain
Province of Cáceres